Ki Hyun Kim (born January 15, 1991) is a South Korean former mixed martial artist who competed in the featherweight division of World Victory Road.

Mixed martial arts career

World Victory Road
Kim made his professional mixed martial arts debut against Seong Hyun Yoon on March 11, 2009 at World Victory Road Presents: Gold Rush Korea. He won the bout via armbar submission in the first round. Later on the same event, Kim faced Jin Hyun Kim. He won the bout via TKO following a corner stoppage in the first round.

Kim then faced Shigeki Osawa on September 23, 2009 at World Victory Road Presents: Sengoku 10. He lost the bout via unanimous decision.

Mixed martial arts record

|-
|Loss
|align=center|2-1
|Shigeki Osawa
|Decision (unanimous)
|World Victory Road Presents: Sengoku 10
|
|align=center|2
|align=center|5:00
|Saitama, Japan
|
|-
|Win
|align=center|2-0
|Jin Hyun Kim
|TKO (corner stoppage)
|World Victory Road Presents: Gold Rush Korea
|
|align=center|1
|align=center|4:58
|Seoul, South Korea
|
|-
|Win
|align=center|1-0
|Seong Hyun Yoon
|Submission (armbar)
|World Victory Road Presents: Gold Rush Korea
|
|align=center|1
|align=center|0:45
|Seoul, South Korea
|
|-

See also 
 List of male mixed martial artists

References

External links 

 

1991 births
Living people
Featherweight mixed martial artists
South Korean male mixed martial artists